"The Galaxy Being" is the first episode of the original The Outer Limits television series, originally broadcast on September 16, 1963.  In it, Allan Maxwell, an engineer for a small radio station, somehow makes contact with a peaceful alien creature – the "Galaxy Being" – who is then transported to Earth by accident.  The Galaxy Being inadvertently kills several people with its natural radiation, and is met with violence and hysteria from the people of Earth.

Opening narration

Plot
Allan Maxwell is an engineer who has dedicated himself to researching microwave background noise using a device powered from his radio station. He inadvertently gets an extraterrestrial being from Andromeda on his three-dimensional television screen. Using his computer, Maxwell is able to translate the being's thought patterns into English. Both are conducting illicit experiments; Maxwell should not be using the radio station's power, and the being is not allowed to use equipment for exploration. The being asks about the human's "holes in face", whereupon Maxwell explains the purposes of his nose and mouth. The being explains that it is a "nitrogen cycle" life form, that there is "no death in our dimension", and that wars are "... forbidden. Reason we are not allowed to contact you, you are danger to other galaxies." The two have further enlightening philosophical conversation, in which no epistemological basis is given for the Andromedan's affirmation that Maxwell's "brain waves" will "go on" subsequent to the death of his carbon-based body. The being explains, "electromagnetic forces underlying all ... electromagnetic force intelligent" and "Infinity is God. God, infinity, all the same", in response to Maxwell's query regarding whether the being believes in God as an intelligent force. Maxwell appears to accept the Andromedan's explanations as the knowledge of a superior being.

Much of this interaction, along with Maxwell's earlier discussion of Faraday with his wife, is a play on James Clerk Maxwell, the father of electromagnetic theory and his predecessor Michael Faraday, as is the alien's reference to quaternions when stating that its species uses "4 dimension numbers" to identify themselves rather than names.

In the evening, Allan reluctantly leaves the radio station to be feted at a banquet. He leaves the channel open to the extraterrestrial being who warns, "Do not increase power levels." DJ Eddie Phillips, who is substituting for Allan's brother Gene "Buddy" Maxwell, after being told not to, turns up the power to full, causing the extraterrestrial to be transmitted to Earth as a three-dimensional electromagnetic being. The 'Galaxy Being', as it is dubbed, wreaks inadvertent havoc, killing Eddie and injuring several other people by burning them with natural radiation. The extraterrestrial encounters Allan in person, who convinces it to turn down the heat, and then guides it back to the transmitter shed. They are soon cornered by local authorities, who accidentally shoot Allan's wife, Carol. The Galaxy Being then uses beneficial radiation to heal the wound.

When the Galaxy Being emerges, the authorities attempt to kill it; but it protects itself by destroying the bullets in flight, again with radiation. As a warning demonstration (and perhaps to prevent other aliens from coming), the Galaxy Being destroys the transmitter tower. The crowd is told, "There are powers in this universe beyond anything you know ... there is much you have to learn. Go to your homes. Go and give thought to the mysteries of the universe. I will leave you now, in peace." At this, the crowd disperses.

The Galaxy Being then chooses not to return home inasmuch as it has violated a law forbidding contact with Earth. So, after first reassuring Allan that "There is no death for me," answering his concerns that it would disintegrate, the Galaxy Being reduces its microwave intensity which causes it to fade out from the Terran realm. Its last words as it vanishes into another putative dimension are "End of transmission".

Closing narration

Sign-off narration

The show’s now-famous introduction and epilogue narration heard from "The Control Voice" was performed by veteran radio, screen and TV actor, Vic Perrin.

Analysis

Booker observes that the engineer and the Galaxy Being are variations of the television and science fiction tropes of the mad scientist and the invading alien, albeit with a reversal typical of The Outer Limits that both the scientist and the alien are benevolent, and it is the ordinary human beings of Earth who are the villains in the story.

The story itself dramatized the coverage in popular media of the time of speculation as to whether other planets could be contacted via radio, most particularly the (at the time recently initiated) "Project Ozma" search for radio signals from extraterrestrial intelligence ("SETI"). 
It developed these themes further into a story about electronic existentialism, and tapped into themes prevalent in U.S. culture at the time, including the televising of the space race and the fascination with television transmission in general.  The Galaxy Being itself echoed the contemporary words of NASA with lines such as "You must explore.  You must reach out."

The story also had elements of horror.  As did another Outer Limits story, "The Borderland", it addressed the idea of an electronic limbo that exists when television signals cease transmission or are broadcast out into space, raising questions such as where the Galaxy Being goes when he turns off the transmitter.  This horror of oblivion was to occur in several other Outer Limits episodes.

Cast

Production
Filming took nine days to complete, at radio station KCBR (now KYSR) in Coldwater Canyon, MGM Backlot #4 Andy Hardy Street, and Soundstage #3 at KTTV Channel 11. The Budget for the production was $213,000.

References

External links
 

Fiction set in the Andromeda Galaxy
The Outer Limits (1963 TV series season 1) episodes
1963 American television episodes
Fiction about intergalactic travel